This page is the complete honour roll of the Carlton Football Club, nicknamed the Blues, which is a professional Australian rules football club based in the inner-Melbourne suburb of Carlton North, Victoria.

Founded in 1864, the club's senior men's team has competed in the unaffiliated Victorian football premiership (until 1876), the Victorian Football Association (1877–1896) and the Australian Football League (formerly the Victorian Football League) (since 1897).

Carlton has also fielded teams in several related competitions. Its senior women's team has contested the AFL Women's league since 2017. It has also fielded men's and women's reserves teams and a men's under-19s team during its history.

Men's seniors

Women's seniors

Women's reserves

Source: Club historical data and VFLW stats

Notes

Carlton Football Club